The English national ice hockey team was the national ice hockey team of England. The club last participated in an international game in 1994, a 6–5 win against Scotland. While England still participates in junior hockey tournaments, in most IIHF tournaments, English players are part of the Great Britain national ice hockey team.

References

External links
English Ice Hockey Association

 
Former national ice hockey teams
Ice